Gundam Song Covers 3 is a cover album by Hiroko Moriguchi, released by Sonic Blade on March 9, 2022. The sequel to 2019's Gundam Song Covers and 2020's Gundam Song Covers 2, the album features Moriguchi's versions of 11 popular Gundam theme songs originally recorded by male vocalists. Musicians collaborating with Moriguchi in the album include pianist Kotaro Oshio, violinist Naoko Terai, Japanese choir VOJA, singer-songwriter Mami Ayukawa, guitarist Masayoshi Ōishi, Wagakki Band shakuhachi player Daisuke Kaminaga, pop duo Salt & Sugar, and rock band TM Network. The album cover, illustrated by Tsukasa Kotobuki, features Moriguchi cosplaying as Sayla Mass, with the RX-78-02 Gundam in the background.

The album is offered in CD only and CD with Blu-ray. In addition, two limited edition releases were offered. The first one was an LP-sized jacket with original stickers and an advanced lottery serial code to purchase a ticket to Moriguchi's "Starry People" concert at Hitomi Memorial Hall on May 3, 2022. The second limited release included a High Grade Universal Century 1/144 scale MSZ-006 Zeta Gundam Ver. Hiroko Moriguchi model kit. Fans who preordered the album received an A4-sized clear file and an illustrated box to store all three Gundam Song Covers CDs.

Upon its release, Gundam Song Covers 3 peaked at No. 3 on Oricon's Weekly Album Ranking on March 13, 2022.

Track listing 
All tracks are arranged by Kōichirō Tokinori, except 1 by Kenji Nishimura, 2 by Kotaro Oshio, 3 by Tetsuya Komuro, 4 by Satoru Shionoya, 6 by Masayoshi Ōishi and eba, and 7 by Naoki Kitajima.

Personnel
 Yūki Muto – piano (track 1)
 Kōichi Tateno – guitar (track 1)
 Keito Hasegawa – bass (track 1)
 Kōhei Oe – drums (track 1)
 Shinsuke Tsujino – alto saxophone, soprano saxophone (track 1)
 Ryō Ogasawara – tenor saxophone (track 1)
 Kensuke Miyaki – baritone saxophone (track 1)
 Kenji Nishimura – trombone (track 1)
 Ryōta Sasaguri – bass saxophone (track 1)
 Hajime Gushiken – trumpet (track 1)
 Maaya Kawahara – trumpet (track 1)
 Kotaro Oshio – acoustic guitar (track 2)
 TM Network (track 3)
 Tetsuya Komuro – keyboards
 Takashi Utsunomiya – chorus
 Naoto Kine – chorus
 Shūta Nishida – acoustic guitar, electric guitar (track 3)
 Masayuki Akahori – bass (track 3)
 Salt & Sugar (track 4)
 Satoru Shionoya – piano
 Chikuzen Satō – vocals
 Kōichirō Tokenori – keyboards (tracks 5, 8, 10–11)
 Kenji Tsuneki – acoustic guitar, electric guitar (track 5)
 Park – bass (tracks 5, 10)
 Hiroshi Matsubara – drums (tracks 5, 10)
 Miho Nakamura – cello (tracks 5, 8, 10)
 Fumiko Aoki – viola (tracks 5, 9–11)
 Miho Shimokawa – violin (tracks 5, 8–11)
 Hiroko Imai – violin (tracks 5, 10)
 Shirō Sasaki – trumpet (track 5)
 Masayoshi Ōishi – guitar, chorus (track 6)
 Sonosuke Takao – piano (track 6)
 Eba – guitar (track 6)
 Naoki Kobayashi – bass (track 6)
 Akira Sakamoto – drums (track 6)
 Naoko Terai – violin (track 7)
 Naoki Kitajima – piano (track 7)
 Yusuke Nakaishi – bass (track 7)
 Ryō Arayama – drums (track 7)
 Yūichi Shima – acoustic guitar, electric guitar (track 8)
 Hiroyuki Deguchi – bass (tracks 8–9, 11)
 Haze – drums (tracks 8–9, 11)
 Akiko Seki – viola (tracks 8–9, 11)
 Moemi Harada – violin (tracks 8–9, 11)
 Daisuke Kaminaga – shakuhachi (track 9)
 Naoya Sasaki – guitar (track 9)
 The Voices of Japan (VOJA)  chorus (track 10)
 Kenji Tsuneki – acoustic guitar, electric guitar (tracks 10–11)
 Mami Ayukawa – vocals (track 11)

Charts

References

External links 
 (Hiroko Moriguchi)
 (King Records)

2022 albums
Hiroko Moriguchi albums
Covers albums
Gundam
Japanese-language albums
King Records (Japan) albums
Sequel albums